A midnight ramble was a segregation-era midnight showing of films for an African American audience, often in a cinema where, under Jim Crow laws they would never have been admitted at other times. The films shown were often from among the over 500 films that were made between 1910 and 1950 in the United States with black producers, writers, actors and directors.

Notes

African-American cinema
Film and video terminology